Sara Errani and Roberta Vinci were the defending champions, but chose not to participate this year.
Elise Mertens and An-Sophie Mestach won the title, defeating Danka Kovinić and Barbora Strýcová in the final, 2–6, 6–3, [10–5].

Seeds

Draw

References 

 Main draw

WTA Auckland Open
ASB Classic – Women's Doubles